Emma Yhnell is a British scientist, science communicator and senior lecturer based at Cardiff University. She has previously conducted research on computerised cognitive training and Huntington's disease. An advocate for public engagement and science communication, and a STEM ambassador, Yhnell won the British Science Association's Charles Darwin Award Lecture for Agricultural, Biological and Medical Sciences and the British Neuroscience Association's Public Engagement Award.

She currently serves as Equal Opportunities & Diversity Representative on the British Neuroscience Association Committee.

Early life and education 
Yhnell attended Chosen Hill School in Gloucestershire (2001-2009). Yhnell then went to Cardiff University for undergraduate study and graduated with a First Class BSc Hons in Biochemistry in 2012. She completed her PhD in 2015, which was funded by an MRC studentship, on Behavioural Neuroscience and Huntington's disease.

Yhnell also completed a Postgraduate Certificate in Clinical Trials  via distance learning through the London School of Hygiene and Tropical Medicine.

Research and career 
Following her doctoral studies, Yhnell worked as a post-doctoral researcher for the Brain Repair Group, then the Neuroscience and Mental Health Research Institute, at Cardiff University. She was named a Research Fellow in 2016, and briefly worked as a consultant for Neem Biotechnology.

Yhnell currently works as a Lecturer in the School of Biosciences at Cardiff University. Her research is on Huntington's disease, a rare genetic brain disorder which causes cognitive, motor, and psychiatric problems. She held a Health and Care Research Wales Fellowship to investigate the potential of computerised cognitive training for people with Huntington's disease, translating her findings from her PhD into the clinical setting with patients.

She is a Fellow of the Higher Education Academy, a British Neuroscience Association Local Group Representative, and a member of the FENS Communication Committee.

Science communication and public engagement 
Yhnell's public engagement work has included speaking at the Hay Festival of Literature & Arts (2018), Soapbox Science (a series of events promoting women working in science) (2018), Cheltenham Science Festival (2019), and Pint of Science (2018) (a festival communicating scientific developments to the general public). In March 2016, Yhnell attended the Westiminster Parliament of the United Kingdom to present on the potential of using games to train the brain, to improve cognition and movement, as part of the national competition SET for Britain. She took part in the Royal Society's Pairing Scheme which aims to bring science to the attention of Parliamentarians and civil servants, she was paired with Kevin Brennan MP. She was a speaker at TEDx Cardiff University in 2017.

She contributed to the book How the Brain Works: The Facts Visually Explained for the publisher Dorling Kindersley (DK), published in March 2020.

Honours and awards 
Yhnell won the Biochemical Society's Science Communication Competition in the Written category in 2015. In 2017 she won the Young Investigator Award from the Cardiff Institute of Tissue Engineering and Repair. In the same year she was a finalist for the Womenspire Chwarae Teg Rising Star award.

In 2018, Yhnell was awarded the British Science Association's Charles Darwin Award Lecture for Agricultural, Biological and Medical Sciences. Yhnell gave her award lecture at the British Science Festival in Hull in September 2018, in which she discussed her cutting edge research in Huntington's disease and its challenges, and public and patient involvement in research in using brain-training. She was awarded the British Neuroscience Association's Public Engagement Award in 2018.

In 2019, Yhnell won the Welsh round of the UK Science Communication Competition Famelab and went on to compete at the UK Finals during Cheltenham Science Festival.

References

External links 
 Video of Emma Yhnell speaking on public engagement
Emma Yhnell on The Neurotransmission podcast
Video of Emma Yhnell speaking at Cardiff University School of Bioscience for International Women's Day 2018
Hunting for a Huntington’s treatment: Q&A with Emma Yhnell, British Science Association blog
 

Living people
Year of birth missing (living people)
Academics of Cardiff University
Science communication award winners
Science communicators
British science writers
British neuroscientists
British women neuroscientists
British women biologists
Welsh biologists